Happy face or Happy Face may refer to:

Smiley, a simple cartoon representation of a smiling face

Brands 
Happy Faces, a brand of British biscuit made by Jacob's Bakery
Happy Face Entertainment, a Korean entertainment company

Crime 
Keith Hunter Jesperson (born 1955), Canadian-American serial killer known by the nickname the "Happy Face Killer"
Happy Face Killer (film), a 2014 Canadian-American television film about the hunt and capture of Jesperson
Happy Face Murders, a 1999 American made-for-television crime drama film

Music 
"Happy Face", a song by the Toadies from their 1994 album Rubberneck
"Happy Face", a song by Destiny's Child from their 2001 album Survivor
Happy Face Records, a label set up by British band Diamond Head during the early 1980s
"Happy Face", a song by Con Funk Shun from the 1980 album Spirit of Love
Happy Face, a 2006 album by Kim McLean
"Happy Face", a song by Ya-kyim from the 2009 album Happy! Enjoy! Fresh!
"Happy Face", a song by Tate McRae from her 2020 EP All the Things I Never Said

Other 
Theridion grallator, sometimes known as the happy-face spider
Happy Face (film), a 2018 film by Alexandre Franchi
Happy Face, a 2017 Netflix comedy special by Ryan Hamilton

See also
Happiness
 Galle (Martian crater), known as the 'happy face crater'
 Put On a Happy Face (disambiguation)